You is the third studio album by British singer-songwriter James Arthur. Released on 18 October 2019, it spawned the singles "Naked", "Empty Space", "Falling Like the Stars", "Treehouse", "Finally Feel Good", "You", and "Quite Miss Home". Arthur embarked on the You – Up Close and Personal tour in North America from 13 September 2019 to 23 September 2019 and was on the UK You – Up Close and Personal tour until 29 October 2019. The album debuted at number two on the UK Albums Chart.

Background
Arthur told 1883 Magazine in June 2019 that the album was "pretty much finished" and that it was undergoing mixing and mastering. He described it as "diverse, conceptual, [and] soulful" as well as "inspired by the stories of others" and "definitely not introspective" as compared to his previous album, 2016's Back from the Edge.

Critical reception
Writing for the Star Tribune, Mark Kennedy gave an overall negative review, calling Arthur "buried in sadness [on You]", adding "[t]o borrow a song title from him, if you can get through this album, you can get through anything". Lisa-Marie Ferla of The Arts Desk gave it a mixed review: she awarded it 3 out of 5 stars but said "[p]rune away at least four soporific ballads, though, and you'll find a decent pop-soul album".
Phoebe Luckhurst from The Evening Standard gave a positive review, stating "He demonstrates his range on soulful 'Marine Parade', and the R'n'B-inflected 'If We Can Get Through This We Can Get Through Anything'. He's in intelligent power-ballad form in 'Car's Outside' and 'Quite Miss Home'".

Track listing

Notes
 signifies a co-producer
 signifies a vocal producer

Credits and personnel
Credits adapted from the album's liner notes.

Vocals
 James Arthur – vocals 
 Johan Carlsson – backing vocals 
 Johanna Strömblad Jonasson – backing vocals 
 Max Martin – backing vocals 
 Charlie Puth – beatbox 
 Eg White – backing vocals

Instrumentation

 James Arthur – guitar 
 Tom Barnes – drums 
 Alexander Beitzke – bass, guitar , keyboards 
 Dan Bingham – bass , drums, piano 
 David Bukovinszky – cello 
 Mattias Bylund – strings 
 Johan Carlsson – guitar, electric guitar, piano, synths, tambourine, B3 organ 
 Jack Duxbury – electric guitar 
 Verity Evanson – cello 
 Rob Harris – guitar 
 Mattias Johansson – violin 
 Pete Kelleher – bass, guitar 
 Ben Kohn – keyboards 
 Jeremy Lertola – guitar 
 Nate Mercereau – bass, guitar, piano 
 Gemma Sharples – violin 
 Paul Turner – bass 
 Eg White – Rhodes piano, synth

Production

 Alexander Beitzke – production , vocal production 
 busbee – production 
 Johan Carlsson – production, vocal production 
 Mark Crew – production , vocal production 
 Ryan Daly – production 
 DaviDior – production 
 Digital Farm Animals – production 
 Carlos de la Garza – additional vocal recording 
 Jamie Hartman – production 
 King Henry – production 
 Nic Nac – production 
 Dan Priddy – production , vocal production 
 Jonathan Quarmby – production 
 Red Triangle – production 
 Ricky Reed – production 
 Bradley Spence – production , vocal production 
 TMS – production 
 Eg White – production

Technical

 busbee – engineering 
 Greg Eliason – engineering, recording 
 Jamie Hartman – engineering, recording 
 Wes Maebe – engineering 
 Nate Mercereau – engineering 
 Red Triangle – engineering, recording 
 Ricky Reed – engineering, programming 
 Alexander Beitzke – engineering, mixing, recording 
 Billy Foster – assistant recording engineering 
 Jeremy Nichols – assistant recording engineering 
 Max Anstruther – assistant engineering 
 Marek Deml – assistant engineering , additional programming 
 Scott Desmarais – assistant engineering 
 Robin Florent – assistant engineering 
 Fabio Senna – assistant engineering 
 Jesse Brock – assistant mix engineer 
 Miles Comaskey – assistant mix engineer 
 Joel Davies – assistant mix engineer 
 Charles Haydon Hicks – assistant mix engineer 
 Tom Barnes – programming 
 Dan Priddy – programming 
 Ricky Reed – programming 
 Steve Fitzmaurice – additional programming , mixing 
 Serge Courtois – mixing 
 Mark Crew – mixing, programming 
 Serban Ghenea – mixing 
 Dan Grech-Marguerat – mixing 
 Manny Marroquin – mixing 
 Tony Maserati – mixing 
 Sean Moffitt – mixing 
 Michelle Mancini – mastering 
 Randy Merrill – mastering

Design
 Adult Art Club – design
 Louis Browne – photography

Charts

Certifications

References

2019 albums
Albums produced by busbee
Albums produced by Digital Farm Animals
Albums produced by Eg White
Albums produced by Jonathan Quarmby
Albums produced by Ricky Reed
Albums produced by TMS (production team)
Albums recorded at RAK Studios
Albums recorded at Westlake Recording Studios
Columbia Records albums
James Arthur albums